Carrot head may refer to:

 a person with red hair (this usage is pejorative)
 the greens of carrots, when used as food
 the fictional character Mr. Carrot Head, a spoof of Mr. Potato Head

See also 
 Poil de carotte (English: Carrot Head), a French short story
 Carrot top (disambiguation)